Joseph Élie Cholette (1890 – November 25, 1947) was a Canadian politician, who represented the electoral district of Nipissing in the Legislative Assembly of Ontario from 1937 to 1943. He was a member of the Ontario Liberal Party. He died in 1947.

References

External links
 

1890 births
1947 deaths
Franco-Ontarian people
Ontario Liberal Party MPPs
People from North Bay, Ontario